The Bay of Pomerania Nature Reserve is a coastal region east of the German island of Rügen in Germany's exclusive economic zone and the continental shelf of the Baltic Sea. It was created on 15 September 2005 by the Red-Green federal government and, together with the Sylt Outer Reef Nature Reserve (Naturschutzgebiet Sylter Außenriff), is one of the few nature reserves established by the federation.

Protected area
The area is part of a European bird reserve, i.e. a Special Protection Area under the Habitats Directive. It has an area of 200,938 hectares and lies east of the island of Rügen and runs from the northern edge of the Adlergrund south of the Arkonasee to the outer boundary of the German exclusive economic zone with Poland in the east as well as in the south to the boundary of the German coastal sea north of the Oder estuary. In the north the Rønnebank and the Adlergrund separate the region from the Arkona Basin.

The conservation order aims to preserve and reinstate the sea region's function as a feeding, over-wintering, moulting, migration and rest area for the species living there, especially for red-throated loon (Gavia stellata), black-throated loon (Gavia arctica), horned grebe (Podiceps auritus), little gull (Larus minutus), common tern (Sterna hirundo), Arctic tern (Sterna paradisaea), red-necked grebe (Podiceps grisegena), long-tailed duck (Clangula hyernalis), scoter (Melanitta nigra), velvet scoter (Melanitta fusca), common gull (Larus canus), lesser black-backed gull (Larus fiscus), guillemot (Uria aalge), razorbill (Alca torda) and black guillemot (Cepphus grylle).

See also
Adlergrund
Bay of Pomerania

References

External links 
 Nature Reserve Act (pdf) with map (pdf)
 Conservation goals (pdf)
 Bay of Pomerania Bird Reserve

Nature reserves in Mecklenburg-Western Pomerania
Baltic Sea
Pomerania
Protected areas established in 2005
2005 establishments in Germany